Kenneth Maiuri  is an American multi-instrumentalist and composer based in Florence, Massachusetts. Since early 2016, he has been the keyboardist for The B-52's.  He has played in numerous other bands, such as Pedro the Lion and The Mammals. He has been part of the live band for performances of "Picture-Stories" created by Ben Katchor and Mark Mulcahy, including The Slug Bearers of Kayrol Island, or, The Friends of Dr. Rushower; A Checkroom Romance; and Up from the Stacks. Maiuri also co-composed the music to Jason Mazzotta's 2015 short film The Century of Love, Part I. He has appeared on Jimmy Kimmel Live! (with The B-52's), The Tonight Show with Jay Leno and The Ellen DeGeneres Show (as a member of the Young@Heart Chorus band), Fresh Air (with Mark Mulcahy), and Mountain Stage (with Mark Mulcahy and The Mammals).

Career
 MediaDarlings (1989-1994) (guitar/vocals, with Cullen Faugno on bass/vocals)
 Sourpuss (1994-1995) (guitar, with Alyssa Marchese on bass, Brian Marchese on drums and Todd McMurray on vocals) 
 Ribboncandy (1996–present) (guitar/vocals, with Joel Boultinghouse from Tizzy on bass and Rich Germain from Stringbean on drums)
 Encyclopedia Brown (drums)
 King Radio (keyboards)
 Mission Orange (keyboards)
 Michael Merenda Jr. & The Voltage Box (drums, glockenspiel, backing vocals)
 Dew Claw (guitar)
 The New Harmful (guitar)
 The Greenbergs (bass)
 TW Walsh (drums, guitar, bass)
 New Radiant Storm King (bass, guitar, keyboards)
 The Aloha Steamtrain (keyboards)
 The Tealights (bass)
 The National Convention (keyboards)
 The Maggies (guitar, keyboards)
 The Mammals (2002-late 2003: bass, guitar, drums, keyboards) 
 School for the Dead (2001 - 2014) (keyboards)
 The Soft Drugs (bass)
 Pedro the Lion (2004 - 2005: bass, backing vocals)
 The Fawns (keyboards)
 Young@Heart Chorus (bass, accordion, piano)
 Marykate O'Neil (keyboards, backing vocals)
 Mark Mulcahy (keyboards, drums, guitar, bass)
 Gentle Hen (2014 - present: keyboards, guitar)
 The B-52's (2016 - present: keyboards, guitar)

Ken Maiuri wrote the weekly music column "Clubland" for the Daily Hampshire Gazette from April 1995 - February 2020.

He hosts the long-running radio programs "Wiggly World" (a freeform mix, Monday nights 8 - 11 p.m. ET) and the "Saturday Jazz Show" (Saturdays 11 a.m. - 2 p.m. ET) online, on the Mixlr broadcast platform.

Discography

1994 
 Sourpuss - Rocket Day (7-inch EP)

1996 
 Ribboncandy - Dynamic Ribbon Device (cassette EP)

1998 
 Ribboncandy - Girlfriend Is Mad (cassette EP)
 King Radio - Mr. K is Dead, Go Home (Tar Hut)

1999 
 Chappaquiddick Skyline - S/T (Sub Pop)

2000 
 Joe Pernice - Big Tobacco (Glitterhouse)
 Spouse - Nozomi (Pigeon/Wormco)
 Pernice Brothers - E.P. (Ashmont Records)

2001 
 Michael J. Merenda Jr. - Trapped In the Valley (Humble Abode)
 The Maggies - Robot Stories (Garageband Records)
 TW Walsh - Blue Laws (Truckstop)
 The Maggies - Breakfast at Brelreck’s (ChickenMan Records)

2002 
 King Radio - The Mission Orange EP (Not Lame)
 The Mammals - Evolver (Humble Abode)
 New Radiant Storm King - Winter's Kill (Rainbow Quartz)
 The Pelicans - London Crawling

2003 
 Pierce Woodward - Leave No Millionaire Behind
 School for the Dead - The Chain CD (Rub Wrongways)
 Sitting Next To Brian - A Cartoon, A Joke (Rub Wrongways)
 The New Harmful - Hum In My Home (Youth Electronix)

2004 
 King Radio - Are You the Sick Passenger? (Spirithouse)
 Pedro the Lion - Tour EP (Self-released)
 Miranda Brown - Baystate (Pigeon)
 School for the Dead - The New You (Rub Wrongways)
 The Mammals - Rock That Babe (Signature Sounds)
 Spouse - Are You Gonna Kiss Or Wave Goodbye? (Pigeon)
 The Q People: A Tribute To NRBQ (Spirithouse)
 Michael J Merenda Jr - Election Day

2005 
 Mark Mulcahy - In Pursuit of Your Happiness (Mezzotint)
 Pierce Woodward - Blow Them Away
 Mark Mulcahy - Franks and a Flag (Mezzotint)
 Mark Mulcahy - Love’s the Only Thing That Shuts Me Up EP (Mezzotint)

2006 
 The Soft Drugs - In Moderation EP
 The Mammals - Departure (Signature Sounds)
 The Ray Mason Band - Don't Mess With Our Routine (Hi-N-Dry)
 The Fawns - A Nice Place To Be (Rub Wrongways)
 Michael J Merenda Jr. - Quiver (Humble Abode)

2007 
 Spouse - Relocation Tactics (Pigeon)

2008 
 Marykate O'Neil - mkULTRA EP (2008)
 The National Convention - The Many Moods of The National Convention (Sweatervest)
 Mike + Ruthy - The Honeymoon Agenda (Humble Abode)
 School for the Dead - A Telephone Built for Two (Rub Wrongways)
 Sitting Next To Brian - Polite (Rub Wrongways) 
 José Ayerve - Nuclear Waste Management Club (Pigeon Records) 
 Young@Heart Chorus - Mostly Live (Rhino 2CD Version) (Rhino Records)

2009 
 The National Convention - The Sexy Sound of The National Convention (Sweatervest)
 Marykate O'Neil - Underground (Circle C)

2010 
 Spouse - Confidence (Nine Mile Records)
 Mike + Ruthy - Million To One (Humble Abode)
 Chris Pureka - How I Learned To See In the Dark (Sad Rabbit Music)
 Mark Mulcahy - Low Birthweight Child (7-inch single, Tongue Master Records)

2011 
 Dennis Crommett - In the Buffalo Surround (Signature Sounds/Soft Alarm)
 Sarah Lee Guthrie & Johnny Irion - Bright Examples (Ninth Street Opus)

2012 
 Young@Heart Chorus - Now 
 Friends: A Tribute of the Songs of Lesa Bezo (Rub Wrongways)

2013 
 Mark Mulcahy - Dear Mark J. Mulcahy, I Love You (Mezzotint)
 Scud Mountain Boys - Do You Love the Sun (Ashmont)
 Heather Maloney - Heather Maloney (Signature Sounds)
 TW Walsh - The Soft Drugs (Tower of Song)

2014 
 J Mascis - Tied to a Star (Sub Pop)
 AG Berg - Alive (single)

2016 
 The Fawns - Goodnight, Spacegirl (Rub Wrongways)
 If It Feels Good, Do It: A Sloan Tribute (Futureman Records)
 Gentle Hen - The Bells On the Boats On the Bay (Rub Wrongways)

2017 
 Mark Mulcahy - The Possum In the Driveway (Mezzotint)
 Gentle Hen - Sneaking Up On the Moon (Rub Wrongways)

2018 

 The Mammals - Sunshiner (Humble Abode)
 J Mascis - Elastic Days (Sub Pop)
 Gentle Hen - Be Nice To Everyone (Rub Wrongways)

2019 

 Mark Mulcahy - The Gus (Mezzotint)
 K & A Surplus - C’mon C’mon

2020 

 The Mammals - Nonet (Humble Abode)
 Brandi Ediss - Bees and Bees and Bees (Futureman Records)
 The Fawns - TLA EP (Rub Wrongways)
 Jason Bourgeois - Let Me Into Your Life (Rub Wrongways)

2021 

 Spouse - Emergency! (Pigeon Records)
 Havin’ a Good Time: A Tribute To Lord Russ (Rub Wrongways)
 Jake Manzi - Whatever My Heart Allows

2022 

 Singing Next to Brian: A Tribute to Brian Marchese (Rub Wrongways)

2023 

 Ken Maiuri - Four Color Press
 Sourpuss - Mob Again Together: Sourpuss 1994-1995

References

External links
 School for the Dead Rockumentary 
 AllMusic page for Ken Maiuri

1971 births
Living people
American rock musicians
The B-52's members
University of Massachusetts alumni
People from Massachusetts
Composers articles needing expert attention